The Sweden national under-21 speedway team is the national under-21 motorcycle speedway team of Sweden and is controlled by the SVEMO. The team started in Under-21 World Cup in all editions and won four medals: two silver (2005 and 2006) and two bronze (2008 and 2009). Denmark has produced three Under-21 World Champions: Peter Nahlin (1988), Mikael Karlsson (1994) and Andreas Jonsson (2000). In 1985 Per Jonsson has won Individual U-21 European Championship open for riders from all continents.

Competition

See also 
 Sweden national speedway team
 Sweden national under-19 speedway team

External links 
 (se) (en) SVEMO webside

National speedway teams
Speedway
Team